DICE is a DEA database that consists largely of phone log and Internet data gathered legally by the DEA through subpoenas, arrests, and search warrants nationwide. DICE includes about 1 billion records, and they are kept for about a year and then purged.

References

Drug Enforcement Administration